Ontheroofs is an urban exploration and rooftopping photography project conceived by Vitaliy Raskalov and Vadim Makhorov, from Ukraine and from Russia respectively.  Their main focus of photography is the exploration of high-rise architectural structures like skyscrapers, bridges, historic sites and cathedrals. The team have been notable for their number of free-climbs up famous buildings and monuments around the world. Typically, their videos are uploaded onto YouTube and showcase their ascent and descent. Raskalov and Makhorov appeared as recurring cast in the documentary series URBEX – Enter At Your Own Risk, which launched globally on Red Bull TV on August 1, 2016.

Members 
The project was conceived by Vitaliy Raskolov. Raskolov grew up in Kyiv,  but at the age of 12, he moved to Moscow, where he would later study journalism, but drop out in 2009 to become a photographer. He met Makhorov, who is from Novosibirsk, while climbing a bridge. In 2017, Raskalov and Makhorov expanded the team to include the New-York based rooftopper Emit, known as em.1t across social media platforms.

Climbs 

In 2012, the duo climbed the Mercury City Tower in Moscow.

Raskalov and Makhorov received press attention in early 2014 when they climbed up the Shanghai Tower, the second tallest building in the world. They entered the construction site of the unfinished tower during the Lunar New Year. The popularity of the video sparked a discussion on the safety and the liability of the incident. Later in 2014, they hijacked an LED billboard on the roof of a Hong Kong building, advertising their Shanghai climb on the billboard.

In April 2016, a video was posted of them climbing the Lotte World Tower in Seoul. Despite the construction site having guard dogs, security officers and monitoring drones, Raskalov and Makhorov managed to bypass the security and climb the under construction building.

In 2017, Raskolov and Emit climbed the Central Park Tower. Other structures climbed by Raskolov are the Eiffel Tower, the Great Pyramid of Giza and the statue of Christ the Redeemer.

References

External links

Photography by genre
Urban exploration
Russian photographers